Pekka Korpi (born 11 November 1949 in Oulu) is a Finnish harness racing trainer and driver. With more than 5 000 wins he is one of the most successful harness drivers in Scandinavia. Since 2011 Korpi has been training and driving mostly in Sweden. During the 1980s he also worked several years in the United States and in Belgium.

Pekka Korpi's son Janne Korpi is an olympic snowboarder.

Sources
Pekka Korpi at Finnish National Horse Breeding Association's pages (In Finnish)

External links
Star Racing – Pekka Korpi's homepage (In Finnish)

Sportspeople from Oulu
1949 births
Living people
Finnish harness racers